The NCAA Season 98 volleyball tournaments are  the volleyball tournaments of the National Collegiate Athletic Association (Philippines) for its 2022–23 season. Emilio Aguinaldo College is hosting the tournament for the first time.

The seniors' tournament began on February 18, 2023, just over seven months after Season 97 ended.

Teams 
All ten schools are participating.

Men's tournament

Men's Line-up

Team standings

Point system:
 3 points = win match in 3 or 4 sets
 2 points = win match in 5 sets
 1 point  = lose match in 5 sets
 0 point  = lose match in 3 or 4 sets

Match-up results

Scores

Bracket

Stepladder semifinals 
As Perpetual won all elimination round games, the stepladder format shall be used. The first two rounds are straight knockout games.

First round

Second round

Finals 
The finals is a best-of-three playoff.

Defending champions (from 2018) Perpetual qualified to the Finals by winning all of its elimination round games.

*If necessary

Women's tournament

Women's Line-up

Elimination round

Team standings

Point system:
 3 points = win match in 3 or 4 sets
 2 points = win match in 5 sets
 1 point  = lose match in 5 sets
 0 point  = lose match in 3 or 4 sets

Match-up results

Scores

Bracket

Stepladder semifinals
As Benilde won all elimination round games, the stepladder format shall be used. The first two rounds are straight knockout games.

First round

Second round

Finals 
The finals is a best-of-three playoff.

Benilde qualified to the Finals by winning all of its elimination round games; the Lady Blazers qualified to its second consecutive Finals appearance.

*If necessary

See also
 UAAP Season 85 volleyball tournaments

References

NCAA (Philippines) volleyball tournaments
2023 in Philippine sport
Current volleyball seasons
February 2023 sports events in the Philippines
March 2023 sports events in the Philippines